
The following is a list of mayors of the city of Valledupar, Colombia.

Notes

References

External links
 Government of Valledupar

Politics of Valledupar
Lists of mayors